Magruder may refer to:

Places
Magruder, Virginia

People

People with the surname Magruder:
Allan B. Magruder, American politician
Benjamin Drake Magruder (1838–1910), Illinois Supreme Court Justice
Caleb Clarke Magruder Jr. (1839–1923), American politician and lawyer
Carter B. Magruder, US Army general
Chris Magruder, American baseball player
Charles Magruder, progenitor of thousands of African-Americans with the surname Magruder or McGruder.
Dick Magruder  (1946–1978), American businessman and politician
J. Maynard Magruder (1900–1969), American businessman and politician
James Magruder, American playwright, author, and translator
Jeb Stuart Magruder, figure in the Watergate scandal
John Magruder (1887–1958), brigadier general in the United States Army
John B. Magruder, American Confederate Army general
Patrick Magruder, Librarian of Congress
Philip W. Magruder (1838–1907), member of Virginia House of Delegates
Richard H. Magruder (died 1884), American politician
Scooter Magruder, online personality
Sydney Magruder Washington, American ballet dancer
Thomas Magruder, the main villain in the video game Gun
Zadok Magruder (1729–1811), Maryland politician

See also
Colonel Zadok A. Magruder High School, in Derwood, Maryland
Magruder's, an American grocery chain
Justice Magruder (disambiguation)